Chaetostoma venezuelae is a species of catfish in the family Loricariidae. It is native to South America, where it occurs in the San Juan River basin in Venezuela. The species reaches 7.3 cm (2.9 inches) SL.

References 

venezuelae
Fish described in 1944
Catfish of South America